"Go" is a song written and performed by the pop-rock band Hanson. It is the second single from their fourth album, The Walk (2007), and the first single to be sung by youngest brother Zac Hanson.

Track listings
Written by Zac Hanson, William James McAuley III and Shannon Curfman.

Go, Part 1:
 "Go" (Radio Edit)
 "Ugly Truth"

Go, Part 2:
 "Go" (Album Edit)
 "I've Been Down"
 "Rip It Up" (Live)
 "Walk" (Live)

Go, DVD:
 "Go" (Music Video)
 "Underneath" (Music Video)
 "Taking the Walk" (Trailer)

Chart performance

Cover version
The song has been recorded by co-writer Bleu for his 2009 album A Watched Pot.

References

2006 songs
2007 singles
2000s ballads
Hanson (band) songs
Songs written by Zac Hanson